Zaine Kennedy (born 5 April 1998) is a speedway rider from Australia.

Speedway career 
Kennedy began his British speedway career when he joined Sheffield Tigers for the SGB Championship 2019. His 2020 season was disrupted by the COVID-19 pandemic, before he signed for the Leicester Lions during the SGB Championship 2021 season.

In 2022, he rode for the Scunthorpe Scorpions in the SGB Championship 2022 but suffered an end of season injury when he fractured his pelvis in a crash. In 2023, he signed for Scunthorpe again for the SGB Championship 2023.

References 

Living people
1998 births
Australian speedway riders
Leicester Lions riders
Scunthorpe Scorpions riders
Sheffield Tigers riders